Tanya Datta (born 16 July 1972) is a British Asian radio and television journalist and writer. Tanya was born in Bristol, and grew up in London. Tanya studied English at Wadham College Oxford University graduating with a first class degree in 1994.  In 1996, she won the Scott Trust Bursary to study journalism at City University and went on to be selected as an ITN News Trainee. In 2000, Tanya joined the BBC where she spent seven years on BBC Radio 4's award-winning foreign affairs series, Crossing Continents. She has also reported for Channel Four, BBC2 and the World Service.

TV career
Tanya made her TV debut in 2004, where she investigated claims of sexual abuse and murder against one of India's most powerful Godmen, Sai Baba in a programme for BBC2 entitled 'The Secret Swami'.

In 2009, she reported in the Explore series on BBC2 uncovering 'Argentina's Dirty War' where she was had a detailed look into the lives of families torn apart by the Perón government's sponsored 'disappearances' of suspected communists.

Radio career
Tanya worked for seven years on the award winning foreign affairs BBC Radio 4 strand Crossing Continentsproducing and presenting programmes from around the world. She also worked on the documentary The Last Taboo looking into inter-racial relationships between the Asian and African-Caribbean communities which sparked a cross-media debate.

Writing
Tanya has been writing a collection of short stories and is currently working on a novel.

References

External links
Official Website
The Secret Swami

1972 births
Living people
Alumni of City, University of London
Alumni of Wadham College, Oxford
British radio presenters
British television presenters
Journalists from Bristol